Vanna Jigina is a 2015 Tamil comedy film, written and directed by Nandha Periyasamy. The film stars Vijay Vasanth and Sanyathara in the lead roles while Singampuli, Ravi Mariya and Ashwin Raja among others form an ensemble cast. Music for the film was composed by John Peters and the film opened to mixed reviews in August 2015.

Cast

 Vijay Vasanth as Pavadai
 Sanyathara as Angel Priya
 Singampuli
 Ravi Mariya
 Ashwin Raja
 Doubt Senthil
 Sugu Venkat as Kishore Kumar
 Ansanpal
 Sridevi as Karugamani
 Dev Anand
 Sai Bharath
 A. Roshan
 George
 Saicharan
 R. Balakrishnan
 P. Balaji
 Preethi
 Pavithra
 Rasiya

Production
The film was launched under the title Jigina in July 2014, and carried on using that title through production, before being christened as Vanna Jigina before the film was censored. The project received further media attention after director N. Linguswamy chose to buy the rights of the film and distribute it under his production studio's banner, Thirrupathi Brothers. Featuring a theme involving social media, Jigina was promoted online through a series of memes, describing scenes from older Tamil films.

Soundtrack
The soundtrack was composed by John Peter. The film's audio launch happened in July 2015, with Vignesh and Ramesh from the film Kaaka Muttai (2015) in attendance as the chief guests.
"Rosapoo" - Hariharasudhan
"Kaathoda" - Surjit, Vinayetha
"Ayyo En Idhayuthula" - Jayamurthy

Release
The film opened to mixed reviews upon release in August 2015, with a critic from The Hindu labelling it as "backward" and criticizing the theme of portraying people with dark skin tones as inferior. Likewise, the critic from the Times of India noted the film is "funny for all the wrong reasons". A reviewer from the Deccan Chronicle gave a more favourable report, citing "the director has made a good attempt with a novel idea and even sends out a strong message", but "where he errs is in its execution" and adds had "he concentrated on an interesting screenplay with few more meaningful dialogues, the film would have been an engaging fare".

References

2015 films
2010s Tamil-language films